Hisingen Blues is the second full-length studio album by Swedish hard rock band Graveyard. It was released on 25 March 2011.

Reception

Scott Alisoglu of Blabbermouth.net said that Hisingen Blues "is too hot to handle without flame retardant gloves" and " is in fact just what the doctor ordered".

Track listing
All Songs Written by Graveyard.
"Ain't Fit to Live Here" - 3:05
"No Good, Mr. Holden" - 4:46
"Hisingen Blues" - 4:13
"Uncomfortably Numb" - 6:11
"Buying Truth (Tack och förlåt)" - 3:27
"Longing" - 4:49
"Ungrateful Are the Dead" - 3:09
"Rss" - 3:48
"The Siren" - 6:00
"Cooking Brew" (digipak edition bonus track) - 4:05

Personnel

Graveyard
Joakim Nilsson: Guitars, Vocals
Jonatan Larocca Ramm: Guitars
Rikard Edlund: Bass
Axel Sjoberg: Drums, Percussion

Additional Musicians
Nils Dahl: Piano
Peteus Fredestad: Hammond B-3

Charts

Weekly charts

Year-end charts

References

2011 albums
Graveyard (band) albums
Nuclear Blast albums
Warner Records albums